Alesya (Алеся) (Olga Yarmolenko)(born Вольга Анатолеўна Ярмоленка) is a Belarusian singer who is a member of the band Syabry. 

Alesya sings both in Belarusian and Russian.  She is the daughter of the band leader  .

Awards and recognition

On November 28, 2005 Alesya received the Gratitude of President recognition.  

In 2012 she was awarded the Francysk Skaryna Medal. The award decree mentioned her as "artist-vocalist (soloist) of higher category Olga Yarmolenko".

References

1976 births
Living people
21st-century Belarusian women singers

be:Алеся